Shut Up and Kiss Me may refer to:
Shut Up and Kiss Me (film), a 2004 film

Music 
Shut Up and Kiss Me (album), a 2002 album by Michelle Wright

Songs 
"Shut Up and Kiss Me" (Mary Chapin Carpenter song), 1994
"Shut Up and Kiss Me" (Orianthi song), 2010
"Shut Up & Kiss Me" (Reece Mastin song), 2012
 "Shut Up & Kiss Me", by Echosmith, from the album Lonely Generation, 2020
 "Shut Up & Kiss Me", by Whitesnake, from the album Flesh & Blood, 2019

See also 
 Kiss Me (disambiguation)
 Shut up (disambiguation)
 "Shut Up Kiss Me", by Angel Olsen, from the album My Woman, 2016